Each "article" in this category is a collection of entries about several stamp issuers, presented in alphabetical order. The entries are formulated on the micro model and so provide summary information about all known issuers.  

See the :Category:Compendium of postage stamp issuers page for details of the project.

Belgian Congo 

Became the Congo Republic and later Zaire.

Dates 	1909–1960
Capital 	Leopoldville
Currency 	100 centimes = 1 franc

Main Article Needed

See also 	Congo Free State

Belgian Occupation Issues 

Main Article Needed

Includes 	Eupen & Malmedy (Belgian Occupation);
		German East Africa (Belgian Occupation);
		Germany (Belgian Occupation)

Belgium 

Dates 	1849 –
Capital 	Brussels
Currency 	(1849) 100 centimes = 1 franc
		(2002) 100 cent = 1 euro

Main Article
Postage stamps and postal history of Belgium

Belgium (German Occupation) 

Dates 	1914–1918
Currency 	100 centimes = 1 franc

Refer 	German Occupation Issues (WW1)

Belize 

Dates 	1973 –
Capital  	Belmopan
Currency 	100 cents = 1 dollar

Main Article
Postage stamps and postal history of Belize

See also 	British Honduras

Belorussia 

Refer 	Belarus

Benadir 

Dates 	1903–1905
Capital 	Mogadishu
Currency 	100 besa = 16 annas = 1 rupia

Refer 	Italian Somaliland

Benghazi (Italian Post Office) 

Italy annexed Libya in 1912 and the office then issued stamps of Libya.

Dates 	1901–1912
Currency 	40 paras = 1 piastre

Refer 	Italian Post Offices in the Turkish Empire

Benin 

Formerly Dahomey.

Dates 	1976 –
Capital 	Porto Novo
Currency 	100 centimes = 1 franc

Main Article
Postage stamps and postal history of Benin

Includes 	Benin (French Colony)

See also 	Dahomey

Benin (French Colony) 

The French colony of Benin issued overprinted French Colonies stamps 1892–99 and was then
incorporated in Dahomey.  In 1976, Dahomey was renamed Benin.

Dates 	1892–1899
Capital 	Porto Novo
Currency 	100 centimes = 1 franc

Refer 	Benin

Bequia 

Unauthorised issues only.  Bequia is one of the islands of the Grenadines of St Vincent.

Refer 	Grenadines of St Vincent

Bergedorf 

Became part of Hamburg in 1867.

Dates 	1861–1867
Currency 	16 schillings = 1 mark

Refer 	German States

Berlin–Brandenburg (Russian Zone) 

Superseded by 1946 general issue for the American, British & Russian Zones.

Dates 	1945 only
Capital 	Berlin (Russian Zone)
Currency 	100 pfennige = 1 mark

Refer 	Germany (Allied Occupation)

Bermuda 

Dates 	1865 –
Capital 	Hamilton
Currency  	(1865) 12 pence = 1 shilling; 20 shillings = 1 pound
		(1970) 100 cents = 1 dollar

Main Article
Postage stamps and postal history of Bermuda

Bessarabia 

Refer 	Moldova

Beyrouth 

Refer 	Beirut (French Post Office);
		Beirut (Russian Post Office)

Bhopal 

Dates 	1876–1949
Currency 	12 pies = 1 anna; 16 annas = 1 rupee

Refer 	Indian Native States

Bhor 

Dates 	1879–1901
Currency 	12 pies = 1 anna; 16 annas = 1 rupee

Refer 	Indian Native States

Bhutan 

Dates 	1962 –
Capital 	Thimphu
Currency 	100 chetrum = 1 ngultrum (rupee)

Main Article
Postage stamps and postal history of Bhutan

Biafra 

Nigerian civil war issues.

Dates 	1968–1969
Capital 	Port Harcourt
Currency 	12 pence = 1 shilling; 20 shillings = 1 pound

Main article  Postage stamps and postal history of Biafra

Refer 	Nigerian Territories

Bijawar 

Dates 	1935–1937
Currency 	12 pies = 1 anna; 16 annas = 1 rupee

Refer 	Indian Native States

BMA 

Refer 	Eritrea (British Military Administration);
		Malaya (British Military Administration);
		North Borneo (British Military Administration);
		Sarawak (British Military Administration);
		Somalia (British Military Administration);
		Tripolitania (British Military Administration)

Bohemia & Moravia 

Dates 	1939–1945
Capital 	Prague
Currency 	100 haleru = 1 koruna

Main Article Needed

Bohmen und Mahren 

Refer 	Bohemia & Moravia

Boka Kotorska 

Refer 	Dalmatia (German Occupation)

Bolívar 

Dates 	1863–1904
Capital 	Montería
Currency 	100 centavos = 1 peso

Refer 	Colombian Territories

Bolivia 

Dates 	1867 –
Capital 	La Paz
Currency 	(1867) 100 centavos = 1 boliviano
		(1963) 100 centavos = 1 peso

Main Article
Postage stamps and postal history of Bolivia

Bophutatswana 

One of the territories ( Bantustans ) up by the South African government as part of its apartheid policy.
Although the territory itself did not acquire international recognition, its stamps were
valid for postage.

Dates 	1977 – 1994
Capital 	Mmabatho (aka Sun City)
Currency 	100 cents = 1 rand

Refer 	South African Territories

Borneo 

Refer 	Japanese Naval Control Area

Bosnia & Herzegovina 

Dates 	1993 –
Capital 	Sarajevo
Currency 	(1993) 100 paras = 1 dinar
		(1997) 100 pfennig = 1 mark

Main Article
Postage stamps and postal history of Bosnia and Herzegovina

Includes 	Bosnia & Herzegovina (Austro–Hungarian Empire);
		Bosnia & Herzegovina (Provincial Issues);
		Bosnia & Herzegovina (Yugoslav Regional Issues);
		Croatian Posts (Bosnia)

See also 	Bosnian Serb Republic;
		Croatia;
		Yugoslavia

Bosnia & Herzegovina (Austro-Hungarian Empire) 

Under the terms of the Treaty of Berlin 1878, Austria-Hungary was authorised to occupy Bosnia & Herzegovina which had previously been in the Turkish (Ottoman) Empire.  In 1908, outright annexation took place and the country became an integral part of the Austro-Hungarian Empire.

During 1912–1918, all stamps were inscribed K-u-K MILITARPOST.

Dates 	1878–1918
Capital 	Sarajevo
Currency 	(1878–1899) 100 kreutzer = 1 florin
		(1900–1918) 100 heller = 1 crown

Refer 	Bosnia & Herzegovina

Bosnia & Herzegovina (Provincial Issues) 

The 1918–21 issues were for provincial use only pending settlement of the political situation
after World War I.

Dates 	1918–1921
Capital 	Sarajevo
Currency 	100 heller = 1 krone

Refer 	Bosnia & Herzegovina

Bosnia & Herzegovina (Yugoslav Regional Issues) 

There was a regional issue in 1945 during shortages of Yugoslav stamps in the aftermath of World War II.

Dates 	1945 only
Capital 	Sarajevo
Currency 	100 banicas = 1 kuna

Refer 	Bosnia & Herzegovina

Bosnian Serb Republic 

Following the collapse of communism in 1989, unrest between ethnic factions in Bosnia &
Herzegovina developed into open hostilities.  In particular, Serbian nationalists began forming
Serbian Autonomous Regions (SARs) and these were rejected by the government in Sarajevo.  The
situation escalated after the government declared independence from Yugoslavia in March 1992.
Despite world recognition of the new state, the Bosnian Serbs and the Yugoslav army attempted
to take control of the country and besieged Sarajevo.  Before long, a Bosnian Serb Republic
(Republika Srpska) was proclaimed at Pale.  It declared allegiance to Serb-dominated
Yugoslavia.

By the Dayton Agreement of November 1995, the country became one state with two autonomous
entities: the Federation of Bosnia and Herzegovina; and the Bosnian Serb Republic.

Stamps inscribed REPUBLIKA SRPSKA have been issued since 1992.

Dates 	1992 –
Capital 	Pale
Currency 	100 paras = 1 dinar

Main Article Needed

See also 	Bosnia & Herzegovina;
		Croatian Posts (Bosnia);
		Yugoslavia

Botswana 

Dates 	1966 –
Capital 	Gaborone
Currency 	(1966) 100 cents = 1 rand
		(1976) 100 thebe = 1 pula

Main Article
Postage stamps and postal history of Botswana

See also 	Bechuanaland

Bouvet Island 

Refer 	Norwegian Dependency

Boyacá 

Dates 	1899–1903
Capital 	Tunja
Currency 	100 centavos = 1 peso

Refer 	Colombian Territories

Brazil 

Dates 	1843 –
Capital 	Brasilia
Currency 	(1843) 1000 = 1 milreis
		(1942) 100 centavos = 1 cruzeiro
		(1967) 100 old cruzeiros = 1 new cruzeiro

Main Article
Postage stamps and postal history of Brazil

Bremen 

Bremen joined the North German Confederation in 1867.

Dates 	1855–1867
Capital 	Bremen
Currency 	22 grote = 10 silbergroschen; 72 grote = 1 thaler

Main Article Needed

Refer 	German States

References

Bibliography
 Stanley Gibbons Ltd, Europe and Colonies 1970, Stanley Gibbons Ltd, 1969
 Stanley Gibbons Ltd, various catalogues
 Stuart Rossiter & John Flower, The Stamp Atlas, W H Smith, 1989
 XLCR Stamp Finder and Collector's Dictionary, Thomas Cliffe Ltd, c.1960

External links
 AskPhil – Glossary of Stamp Collecting Terms
 Encyclopaedia of Postal History

Belge